LIC is a three-letter abbreviation that may refer to:

 Hlai language (an ISO639-3 code: lic)
 Laudetur Iesus Christus, a  Roman Catholic greeting
 Abbreviation for license
 Licentiate, a degree
 Life Insurance Corporation, an Indian government-owned corporation
 Ligand-gated ion channel, a family of proteins
 Ligation-independent cloning, a form of molecular cloning
 Line integral convolution, a technique to visualize fluid motion
 Linear integrated circuit
 Listed investment company, the Australian term for "closed-end fund"
 Lithium-ion capacitor
 Livestock Improvement Corporation, a multinational dairy farming technology co-operative headquartered in New Zealand
 Local Interstellar Cloud, an interstellar cloud
 Long Island City, a neighborhood in New York City
 Low intensity conflict, in warfare
 Low-income country, a form of categorizing a country's level of development 
 Lugar de Importancia Comunitaria, name for Site of Community Importance in Spain

See also

 LICS (disambiguation)